Nikolai Andreyevich Melnikov (born January 24, 1948) is a former water polo player for the Soviet Union.  He is Jewish, and was born in Moscow, Russia.  He won a gold medal at the 1972 Olympics in Munich.

See also
 Soviet Union men's Olympic water polo team records and statistics
 List of Olympic champions in men's water polo
 List of Olympic medalists in water polo (men)
 List of world champions in men's water polo
 List of World Aquatics Championships medalists in water polo
 List of select Jewish water polo players

References

External links
 

1948 births
Living people
Soviet male water polo players
Olympic water polo players of the Soviet Union
Water polo players at the 1972 Summer Olympics
Water polo players at the 1976 Summer Olympics
Olympic gold medalists for the Soviet Union
Olympic medalists in water polo
Jewish water polo players
Soviet Jews
Russian Jews
Sportspeople from Moscow
Medalists at the 1972 Summer Olympics
Russian male water polo players
Universiade medalists in water polo
Moscow State University alumni
Universiade gold medalists for the Soviet Union